Victoria Mata (formally, Mercedes Victoria Mata García) is the Venezuelan minister for Sport. She was appointed on 4 January 2008 as part of a "profound restructuring" of the government.

See also 
 Cabinet of Hugo Chávez

References

Living people
Women government ministers of Venezuela
Year of birth missing (living people)
21st-century Venezuelan women politicians
21st-century Venezuelan politicians